David Ofei  (born June 7, 1989) is a Ghanaian football player who plays in Ghana for  Amidaus Professionals.

Career 
The attacking midfielder started his career with Tromeso (near Wenchi) based club Young Sparrows. In summer 2004 left Tromeso and joined to Great Olympics, which loaned him in the Spring 2007 to lower league side Okwaho Mountains. After one season returned to Great Olympics, which sold him now to New Edubiase FC. On 1 July 2011 left New Edubiase United and signed with Ghana Premier League champion Asante Kotoko SC. He played two years with Asante, before signed on 1. September 2013 for League rival Amidaus Professionals.

International 
Ofei was member of the Ghana U-17 at African U-17 Championship 2005 in Gambia.

References 

1989 births
Living people
Ghanaian footballers
New Edubiase United F.C. players
Accra Great Olympics F.C. players
Association football midfielders
Asante Kotoko S.C. players